A by-election was held for the New South Wales Legislative Assembly electorate of Balmain South on 6 December 1902 because of the resignation of Sydney Law from  and the parliament. Following the 1901 election, the Progressive Party had formed a government with the support of Labour. In 1902 a man named Moss Friedman had been found guilty by a jury, however the judge disagreed with the guilty verdict. The Attorney General, Bernhard Wise, remitted Friedman's sentence and Joseph Carruthers, the Leader of the Opposition, moved a motion in the Legislative Assembly to censure Wise. Law voted in support of the motion despite a Labour decision to oppose it. Law chose to resign and recontest the seat as an  candidate.

Dates

Result

See also
Electoral results for the district of Balmain South
List of New South Wales state by-elections

Notes

References

1902 elections in Australia
New South Wales state by-elections
1900s in New South Wales